Bank of China Mansion is a 54-floor 241 meter (791 foot) tall skyscraper completed in 1999 located in Qingdao, China.

See also
 List of tallest buildings in the world

Bank of China
Skyscrapers in Qingdao